Osijek Archaeological Museum is an archaeological museum in Osijek, Croatia. It is located in Tvrđa.

It consists of two buildings: The City Guard and Brožan House.

The museum was established on 28 April 2005 by a decision of the Government of the Republic of Croatia.

It was opened on 16 November 2007, in a ceremony attended by Božo Biškupić, the Minister of Culture.

References

External links 
  

Museums established in 2005
2005 establishments in Croatia
Osijek
Museums in Osijek
History of Osijek